The Chartered Institute for Securities & Investment (CISI) is a global professional body for those in the financial and investment profession. It offers a range of qualifications and resources for professional development, as well as setting standards of conduct and ethics for those in the industry.

History 
The CISI was formed in 1992 as the Securities Institute by the members of the London Stock Exchange. It changed its name to the Securities and Investment Institute in November 2004. It became the Chartered Institute for Securities & Investment when it was granted a Royal Charter in October 2009.   In November 2015 the Institute of Financial Planning was formally merged into the CISI. In 2017, CISI, the Chartered Insurance Institute and the Chartered Institute of Bankers in Scotland formed the Chartered Body Alliance.

It is headquartered in London and has offices in Sri Lanka, India, The Philippines, United Arab Emirates, Ireland, Spain and Kenya.
The institute is a registered charity.

The CISI has five grades of membership: Affiliate, Student, Associate (ACSI), Chartered Member (MCSI), and Chartered Fellow (FCSI).

Qualifications
The institute offers qualifications, training and professional membership. As the main examining body for the industry, the Institute provides vocational qualifications. Over 40,000 CISI qualifications are taken every year in over 80 countries at Computer Based Test (CBT) centres worldwide. See Professional certification in financial services.

The institute is the pre-eminent Financial Planning professional body in the UK, holding the licence to award the globally recognised Certified Financial Planner (CFP) designation.

Well known, is its CISI Diploma in Capital Markets (previously, SII Diploma). This is a globally recognised postgraduate finance qualification and covers the areas of securities, investment, compliance, derivatives, corporate finance and operations.
It is aimed at practitioners working in wholesale securities markets.
The Diploma provides flexibility and choice, enabling candidates to concentrate on those topics relevant to their chosen career path; it comprises theoretical and practical knowledge, covering securities and financial markets, and then specific selected instruments, in a structured sequence.
Obtaining the CISI Diploma entitles candidates to join the CISI at MCSI Membership level.
See .

Other similarly structured designations offered, also leading to MCSI status, are the Corporate Finance Qualification (CF), in conjunction with ICAEW, and the Chartered Wealth Manager Qualification (CWM).

CISI also offers a Continuing Professional Development (CPD) scheme to members of all levels of seniority, geographical location and industry specialisation. CISI produces publications and workbooks, runs conferences and seminars and in-house training courses.

The institute is the only professional body globally to mandate that its members have to sit an integrity test - Integrity Matters.

Link with other bodies
MIPA/FIPA members of the Institute of Public Accountants are recognised by the Chartered Institute for Securities & Investment (CISI) for admission to CISI's full membership (MCSI). Full membership of the CISI.
Chartered Body Alliance: An Alliance between CISI, Chartered Insurance Institute and Chartered Banker Institute formed in 2017.

See also
British professional bodies
List of organisations in the United Kingdom with a royal charter

References

External links

 

1992 establishments in England
Business organisations based in London
Professional associations based in the United Kingdom